Winsome Sears (née Earle; born March 11, 1964) is a Jamaican-born American politician serving as the 42nd lieutenant governor of Virginia. A member of the Republican Party, Sears served in the Virginia House of Delegates from 2002 to 2004. She also served on the Virginia Board of Education, and she ran unsuccessfully for the U.S. House of Representatives in Virginia's 3rd congressional district in 2004 and for U.S. Senate in 2018. In 2021, Sears was elected lieutenant governor of Virginia.

Sears is the first woman to serve as lieutenant governor of Virginia, and is the first woman of color and first Jamaican-born American citizen elected to statewide office in Virginia.

Early life, education, and career before politics
Sears was born in Kingston, Jamaica on March 11, 1964, and she immigrated to the United States at the age of six. She grew up in the Bronx, New York City. Sears earned an A.A. from Tidewater Community College, a B.A. in English with a minor in economics from Old Dominion University and an M.A. in organizational leadership from Regent University.

Sears served as an electrician in the United States Marines from 1983 to 1986. Before running for public office, Sears directed a Salvation Army homeless shelter.

Political career
In November 2001, Sears upset 20-year Democratic incumbent Billy Robinson while running for the 90th district seat in Virginia's House of Delegates, becoming the first Jamaican female Republican, first female veteran, and first naturalized citizen delegate, to serve in the body. In 2004, Secretary of Veterans Affairs Anthony J. Principi appointed her to the  U.S. Department of Veterans Affairs' Advisory Committee on Women Veterans.

In 2004, Sears unsuccessfully challenged Democrat Bobby Scott for Virginia's 3rd congressional district seat. She received 31% of the vote.

Sears opened a home appliance business in Virginia after her 2004 election loss.

Governor Bob McDonnell appointed Sears to the Virginia Board of Education in 2011.

In September 2018, Sears entered the race for U.S. Senate as a write-in candidate after Corey Stewart won the Republican nomination, citing his past alliances with white nationalists and other racial controversies. She received less than 1% of the vote.

During the 2020 United States presidential election campaign, Sears supported Donald Trump and was national chairwoman of the PAC "Black Americans to Re-elect the President."

After Republicans heavily underperformed and Trump endorsed candidates lost in critical battleground states in the 2022 midterms, Sears criticized Trump, calling him a liability on the party and said she would not support Trump in the 2024 presidential election.

Lieutenant Governor of Virginia

2021 lieutenant gubernatorial election
On May 11, 2021, Sears won the Republican nomination for lieutenant governor of Virginia on the fifth ballot, defeating former state delegate and second-place finisher Tim Hugo 54% to 46%. On November 2, 2021, she won the race along with gubernatorial candidate Glenn Youngkin and attorney general candidate Jason Miyares. She was inaugurated as the 42nd lieutenant governor of Virginia on January 15, 2022. She is the first female lieutenant governor of Virginia as well as the first black woman lieutenant governor and statewide office-holder in the Commonwealth.

During the election campaign, she declined to state whether she had been vaccinated against COVID-19, but she encouraged others to get vaccinated.

Political positions

Abortion
During her campaign for lieutenant governor, Sears initially said she would support legislation similar to the Texas Heartbeat Act, which would make an abortion illegal as soon as fetal heartbeat was detected (as early as six weeks). She has stated that abortion should be allowed in cases of rape and incest, or to prevent harm to a pregnant woman. Later in her 2021 campaign, WRIC-TV wrote that Sears "appeared to backtrack" on her initial comments about the Texas Heartbeat Act. Sears said she did not examine the Texas law, and she declined to state when she thought abortion should be made illegal. After Roe v. Wade was overturned by the Supreme Court of the United States in Dobbs v. Jackson Women's Health Organization, Sears announced her support for a 15-week abortion ban.

Cannabis
In 2021, Sears said she supported medical marijuana but opposed the legalization of marijuana for recreational use.

Education
Sears has called for the opening of more charter schools, lab schools, and virtual schools in Virginia.

Sears has argued that critical race theory (CRT) was "definitely being taught in some form or fashion" in Virginia schools, and accused critics of using "semantics" to deny it. Politifact rated as "False" Glenn Youngkin's claim that critical race theory has "moved into all of our schools in Virginia." The site found that, though CRT had been discussed among educators, it was not part of the state's "Standards of Learning" and several school districts denied teaching it to students. Sears called the CRT concept "racist;" she also said the good and bad of American history should be taught.

After COVID-19 interrupted schooling in the state, Sears floated the possibilities of having year-round school or longer school days to make up lost educational time.

LGBT rights
Sears opposed same-sex marriage in her 2004 campaign and wrote in an op-ed that she strongly supported a Constitutional amendment defining marriage as being between a man and a woman and that "our society has gone immeasurably beyond almost all standards in accommodating the homosexual community over the last couple of decades." Sears supports civil unions, but she believes same-sex marriage will continue under precedent.

Gun rights
Sears supports gun rights. Her 2021 lieutenant gubernatorial campaign included a photo of Sears with a rifle that was used on campaign material and social media, which drew criticism from Democrats but also increased her prominence among Republicans, helping elevate her from political obscurity.

Personal life 
Sears is married to Terence Sears. She has had three daughters. One of Sears's daughters died in a 2012 car crash, along with Sears's two young granddaughters. As of 2016, she and her family resided in Winchester. She is a devout Christian, and authored a Christian self-help book, Stop Being a Christian Wimp!, before entering politics.

Electoral history

See also 
 List of minority governors and lieutenant governors in the United States

References

External links
 
 
 
 
 

|-

|-

1964 births
20th-century African-American people
20th-century African-American women
21st-century African-American women
21st-century African-American politicians
21st-century American politicians
21st-century American women politicians
Activists from Virginia
African-American Christians
African-American people in Virginia politics
African-American state legislators in Virginia
African-American women in politics
American gun rights activists
Candidates in the 2004 United States elections
Candidates in the 2018 United States Senate elections
Christians from Virginia
Black conservatism in the United States
Female United States Marine Corps personnel
Jamaican emigrants to the United States
Lieutenant Governors of Virginia
Living people
Republican Party members of the Virginia House of Delegates
Military personnel from New York City
Old Dominion University alumni
Politicians from the Bronx
Politicians from Kingston, Jamaica
Politicians from Norfolk, Virginia
Regent University alumni
Tidewater Community College alumni
United States Marines
Women state legislators in Virginia